The Sultanate of Sulu (Tausūg: Kasultanan sin Sūg, كاسولتانن سين سوڬ; Malay: Kesultanan Sulu;) was a Muslim state that ruled the Sulu Archipelago, parts of Mindanao and certain portions of Palawan in today's Philippines, alongside parts of present-day Sabah, North and East Kalimantan in north-eastern Borneo.

The sultanate was founded either on 17 November 1405 or 1457 by Johore-born explorer and religious scholar Sharif ul-Hashim. Paduka Mahasari Maulana al Sultan Sharif ul-Hashim became his full regnal name, Sharif-ul Hashim is his abbreviated name. He settled in Buansa, Sulu. After the marriage of Abu Bakr and a local dayang-dayang (princess) Paramisuli, he founded the sultanate. The sultanate gained its independence from the Bruneian Empire in 1578.

At its peak, it stretched over the islands that bordered the western peninsula of Zamboanga in Mindanao in the east to Palawan in the north. It also covered areas in the northeast of Borneo, stretching from Marudu Bay, to Tepian Durian (in present-day Kalimantan, Indonesia). Another source stated the area included stretched from Kimanis Bay, which also overlaps with the boundaries of the Bruneian Sultanate. Following the arrival of western powers such as the Spanish, the British, the Dutch, French, Germans, the Sultan thalassocracy and sovereign political powers were relinquished by 1915 through an agreement that was signed with the United States. In the second half of the 20th century, Filipino government extended official recognition of the head of the royal house of the sultanate, before the ongoing succession dispute.

In Kakawin Nagarakretagama, the Sultanate of Sulu is referred to as Solot, one of the countries in the Tanjungnagara archipelago (Kalimantan-Philippines), which is one of the areas that is under the influence of the mandala area of the Majapahit kingdom in the archipelago.

History

Pre-establishment

The present area of the Sultanate of Sulu was once under the influence of the Bruneian Empire before it gained its own independence in 1578. During the 13th century the people of Sulu began migrating to present-day Zamboanga and the Sulu archipelago from their homelands in northeastern Mindanao. Scott (1994) mentions the origins of the Sulu as being the descendants of ancient Butuanons and Surigaonons from the Rajahnate of Butuan, which was then Hindu like pre-islamic Sulu. They moved south and established a spice trading port in pre-Islamic Sulu. Sultan Batarah Shah Tengah, who ruled as sultan in 1600, was said to be an actual native of Butuan. The Butuanon-Surigaonon origins of the Tausugs is suggested by the relationship of their languages, as the Butuanon, Surigaonon and Tausug languages are all grouped under the Southern sub-family of Visayan. Later, the earliest known settlement in this area soon to be occupied by the sultanate was in Maimbung, Jolo. During this time, Sulu was called Lupah Sug. The principality of Maimbung, populated by Buranun people (or Budanon, literally means "mountain-dwellers"), was first ruled by a certain rajah who assumed the title Rajah Sipad the Older. According to Majul, the origins of the title rajah sipad originated from the Hindu sri pada, which symbolises authority. The principality was instituted and governed using the system of rajahs. Sipad the Older was succeeded by Sipad the Younger.

Some Chams who migrated to Sulu were called Orang Dampuan. The Champa civilization and the port-kingdom of Sulu engaged in commerce with each other which resulted in merchant Chams settling in Sulu where they were known as Orang Dampuan from the 10th–13th centuries. In contrast to their cousins in the Butuan Rajahnate that considered themseleves diplomatic competitors against Champa for China trade, (under Butuan's Rajah Kiling); instead, Sulu freely traded with the Champa civilization. The Orang Dampuans from Champa however were eventually slaughtered by envious native Sulu Buranuns due to the wealth of the Orang Dampuan. The Buranun were then subjected to retaliatory slaughter by the Orang Dampuan. Harmonious commerce between Sulu and the Orang Dampuan was later restored. The Yakans were descendants of the Taguima-based Orang Dampuan who came to Sulu from Champa. Sulu received civilization in its Indic form from the Orang Dampuan.

During the reign of Sipad the Younger, a mystic named Tuan Mashā′ikha arrived in Jolo in 1280 AD. Little is known to the origins and early biography of Tuan Mashā′ikha, except that he is a Muslim "who came from foreign lands" at the head of a fleet of Muslim traders, or he was issued from a stalk of bamboo and was considered a prophet, thus well respected by the people. Other reports, however, insisted that Tuan Mashā′ikha together with his parents, Jamiyun Kulisa and Indra Suga, were sent to Sulu by Alexander the Great (who is known as Iskandar Zulkarnain in Malay Annals). However, Najeeb Mitry Saleeby, a Lebanese American doctor who wrote A History of Sulu in 1908 and other studies of the Moros, dismisses this claim by concluding that Jamiyun Kulisa and Indra Suga were mythical names. According to tarsila, during the coming of Tuan Mashā′ikha, the people of Maimbung worshipped tombs and stones of any kind. After he preached Islam in the area, he married Sipad the Younger's daughter, Idda Indira Suga and bore three children: Tuan Hakim, Tuan Pam and 'Aisha. Tuan Hakim, in turn, begot five children. From the genealogy of Tuan Mashā′ikha, another titular system of aristocracy called "tuanship" started in Sulu. Apart from the Idda Indira Suga, Tuan Mashā′ikha also married into another "unidentified woman" and begot Moumin. Tuan Mashā′ikha died in 710 A.H. (equivalent to 1310 AD), and was buried in Bud Dato near Jolo, with an inscription of Tuan Maqbālū.

A descendant of Tuan Mashā′ikha named Tuan May also begot a son named Datu Tka. The descendants of Tuan May did not assume the title tuan, instead, they started to use datu. It is the first time datu was used as a political institution. During the coming of Tuan Mashā′ikha, the Tagimaha people (literally means "the party of the people") coming from Basilan and several places in Mindanao, also arrived and settled in Buansa. After the Tagimaha came the Baklaya people (which means "seashore dwellers"), believed to be originated from Sulawesi, and settled in Patikul. After these came the Bajau people (or Samal) from Johor. The Bajau were accidentally driven towards Sulu by a heavy monsoon, some of them to the shores of Brunei and others to Mindanao. The population of Buranun, Tagimaha, and Baklaya in Sulu created three parties with distinct system of government and subjects. In the 1300s the Chinese annals, Nanhai zhi, reported that Brunei invaded or administered the Philippine kingdoms of Butuan, Sulu and Ma-i (Mindoro) which would regain their independence at a later date. According to the Nagarakretagama, the Majapahit Empire under Emperor Hayam Wuruk, invaded Sulu at year 1365. However, in 1369, the Sulus rebelled and regained independence and in vengeance, assaulted the Majapahit Empire and its province Po-ni (Brunei), and had invaded the Northeast Coast of Borneo and thereafter went to the capital, looting it of treasure and gold. In the sacking of Brunei, the Sulus had stolen 2 sacred pearls from the Bruneian king. A fleet from the Majapahit capital succeeded in driving away the Sulus, but Po-ni was left weaker after the attack. Since Chinese historiographies later recorded there to be a Maharaja of Sulu, it is assumed that it was unable to be reconquered by Majapahit and it was a rival to that state. By 1390 AD, Rajah Baguinda Ali, a prince of the Pagaruyung Kingdom arrived at Sulu and married into the local nobility. At least in 1417, when Sulu rivaled Majapahit, according to Chinese annals, three kings (or monarchs) ruled three civilised kingdoms in the island. Patuka Pahala (Paduka Batara) ruled the eastern kingdom (The Sulu Archipelago), he was the most powerful; the west kingdom was ruled by Mahalachi (Maharajah Kamal ud-Din) (Ruler of Kalimantan in Indonesia); and the kingdom near the cave (or Cave King) was Paduka Patulapok (From Palawan Island). The Bajau settlers were distributed among the three kingdoms. During this time, Sulu had avenged itself from Majapahit Imperialism by encroaching upon the Majapahit Empire as the alliance of the 3 Sulu kings had territory that reached Kalimantan, specifically East and North Kalimantan, which were former Majapahit provinces.

Moumin's descendants, the son of Tuan Mashā′ikha populated Sulu. After some time, a certain Timway Orangkaya Su'il was mentioned by the second page of tarsila, that he received four Bisaya slaves (People from the Kedatuan of Madja-as) from Manila (presumably Kingdom of Maynila) as a sign of friendship between the two countries. The descendants of Timway Orangkaya Su'il then inherited the title timway, which means "chief". On tarsila's third page, it accounts the fact that the slaves were the ancestors of the inhabitants in the island to Parang, Lati, Gi'tung, and Lu'uk respectively.

The fourth page then narrates the coming of the Buranun (addressed in the tarsila as "the Maimbung people") Tagimaha, Baklaya, then the drifted Bajau immigrants from Johor. The condition of Sulu before the arrival of Islam can be summarised as such: The island was inhabited by several cultures, and was reigned over by three independent kingdoms ruled by the Buranun, Tagimaha, and Baklaya peoples. Likewise, the socio-political systems of these kingdoms were characterised by several distinct institutions: rajahship, datuship, tuanship and timwayship. The arrival of Tuan Mashā′ikha afterwards established a core Islamic community in the island.

Islamisation and establishment

The Sulu Archipelago was an entrepôt that attracted merchants from south China and various parts of Southeast Asia beginning in the 14th century. The name "Sulu" is attested in Chinese historical records as early as 1349, during the late Yuan dynasty (1271–1368), suggesting the existence of trade relations around this time. Trade continued into the early Ming dynasty (1368–1644), as envoys were sent in several missions to China to trade and pay tribute to the emperor. Sulu merchants often exchanged goods with Chinese Muslims, and there was also trade with Muslims who were of Arab, Persian, Malay, or Indian descent. Islamic historian Cesar Adib Majul argues that Islam was introduced to the Sulu Archipelago in the late 14th century by Chinese and Arab merchants and missionaries from Ming China.

Around this time, a notable Arab judge and religious scholar named Karim ul-Makhdum from Mecca arrived in Malacca. He preached Islam to the people, and thus many citizens, including the ruler of Malacca, converted to Islam. The Sulu leader Paduka Pahala and his sons moved to China, where he died, and Chinese Muslims brought up his sons in Dezhou, where their descendants live and have the surnames An and Wen. In 1380 AD, Karim ul-Makhdum arrived in Simunul island from Malacca, again with Arab traders. Apart from being a scholar, he operated as a trader; some see him as a Sufi missionary originating from Mecca. He preached Islam in the area, and was thus accepted by the core Muslim community. He was the second person who preached Islam in the area, following Tuan Mashā′ikha. To facilitate easy conversion of nonbelievers, he established a mosque in Tubig-Indagan, Simunul, which became the first Islamic temple to be constructed in the area, as well as the first in the Philippines. This later became known as Sheik Karimal Makdum Mosque. He died in Sulu, although the exact location of his grave is unknown. In Buansa, he was known as Tuan Sharif Awliyā. On his alleged grave in Bud Agad, Jolo, an inscription was written as "Mohadum Aminullah Al-Nikad". In Lugus, he is referred to as Abdurrahman. In Sibutu, he is known by his name.

The different of beliefs on his grave locations came about due to the fact that Karim ul-Makhdum travelled to several islands in the Sulu Sea to preach Islam. In many places in the archipelago, he was beloved. It is said that the people of Tapul built a mosque honouring him and that they claim descent from Karim ul-Makhdum. Thus, the success of Karim ul-Makhdum of spreading Islam in Sulu threw a new light in Islamic history in the Philippines. The customs, beliefs and political laws of the people changed and customised to adopt the Islamic tradition.

Sulu abruptly stopped sending tributes to the Ming in 1424. Antonio Pigafetta, in his journals, records that the sultan of Brunei went and invaded Sulu in order subjugate the nation and retrieve the two sacred pearls Sulu pillaged from Brunei during earlier times. A sultan of Brunei, Sultan Bolkiah married a princess (dayang-dayang) of Sulu, Puteri Laila Menchanai, and they became the grandparents of the Muslim prince of Maynila, Rajah Matanda, as Manila was a Muslim city-state and vassal to Brunei before the Spanish colonized them and converted them from Islam to Christianity. Islamic Manila ended after the failed attack of Tarik Sulayman, a Muslim Kapampangan commander, in the failure of the Conspiracy of the Maharlikas, when the formerly Muslim Manila nobility attempted a secret alliance with the Japanese shogunate and Bruneiean sultanate (together with her Manila and Sulu allies) to expel the Spaniards from the Philippines. The Spanish had native allies against the former Muslims they conquered like Hindu Tondo which resisted Islam when Brunei invaded and established Manila as a Muslim city-state to supplant Hindu Tondo.

Maritime power

The Sulu sultanate became notorious for its so-called "Moro Raids" or acts of piracy directed toward Spanish settlements in the Visayan areas with the aim of capturing slaves and other goods from these coastal towns. The Tausug pirates used boats known collectively by Europeans as proas (predominantly the lanong and garay warships), which varied in design and were much lighter than the Spanish galleons and could easily out-sail these ships, and also often carried large swivel guns or lantaka and also carried a crew of pirates from different ethnic groups throughout Sulu, such as the Iranun, Bajaus and Tausugs alike. By the 18th century, the Sulu pirates had become the virtual masters of the Sulu seas and the surrounding areas, wreaking havoc on Spanish settlements. This prompted the Spaniards to build a number of fortifications across the Visayan islands of Cebu and Bohol; churches were built on higher ground, and watchtowers were built along coastlines to warn of impending raids.

The maritime supremacy of Sulu was not directly controlled by the sultan, independent datus and warlords waged their own wars against the Spaniards and even with the capture of Jolo on numerous occasions by the Spaniards, other settlements like Maimbung, Banguingui and Tawi-Tawi were used as assembly areas and hideouts for pirates.

The sultanate's control over the Sulu seas was at its height around the late 17th to early 18th centuries when Moro raids became very common for the Visayans and Spaniards.

In Sulu and in the Mindanao interior, the slave trade flourished and majority of these slaves that were being imported and exported were of Visayan ethnicity; the term Bisaya eventually became synonymous to "slave" in these areas. Its maritime supremacy over the Spaniards, at the time, the Spaniards acquired steam-powered ships that began to curb Muslim piracy in the region, the Moro piratical raids began to decrease in number until Governor Narciso Clavería launched the Balanguingui expedition in 1848 to crush the pirate settlements there, effectively ending the Moro pirate raids. By the last quarter of the 19th century, Moro pirates had virtually disappeared and the maritime influence of the sultanate became dependent on the Chinese junk trade.

Spanish and British annexations

In the 18th century, Sulu's dominion covered most of northeastern part of Borneo. However areas like Tempasuk and Abai had never really shown much allegiance to its earlier ruler, Brunei, subsequently similar treatment was given to Sulu. Dalrymple, who made a treaty of allegiance in 1761 with Sulu, had to make a similar agreement with the rulers of Tempasuk and Abai on the north Borneo coast in 1762. The Sultanate of Sulu totally gave up its domain over Palawan to Spain in 1705 and Basilan to Spain in 1762. The territory ceded to Sulu by Brunei initially stretched south to Tapean Durian (now Tanjong Mangkalihat) (another source mentioned the southernmost boundary is at Dumaring), near the Straits of Macassar (now Kalimantan). From 1726 to 1733, the Sulu sultanate restarted their tributary relationship with China, now the Qing Empire, about 300 years since it last ended.

By 1800–1850, the areas gained from Brunei had been effectively controlled by the sultanate of Bulungan in Kalimantan, reducing the boundary of Sulu to a cape named Batu Tinagat and Tawau River.

In 1848 and 1851, the Spanish launched attacks on Balanguingui and Jolo respectively. A peace treaty was signed on 30 April 1851 in which the sultan could only regain its capital if Sulu and its dependencies became a part of the Philippine Islands under the sovereignty of Spain. There were different understandings of this treaty, in which although the Spanish interpreted it as the sultan accepted Spanish sovereignty over Sulu and Tawi-Tawi, however the sultan took it as a friendly treaty amongst equals. These areas were only partially controlled by the Spanish, and their power was limited to only military stations and garrisons and pockets of civilian settlements. This lasted until they had to abandon the region as a consequence of their defeat in the Spanish–American War. On 22 January 1878, an agreement was signed between the Sultanate of Sulu and British commercial syndicate (Alfred Dent and Baron de Overbeck), which stipulated that North Borneo was either ceded or leased (depending on translation used) to the British in return for payment of five thousand malayan dollars per year.

Sulu version

British version 

On 22 April 1903, Sultan Jamalul Kiram signed a document known as "Confirmation of cession of certain islands", in which he granted and ceded additional islands in the neighbourhood of the mainland of North Borneo from Banggi Island to Sibuku Bay to British North Borneo Company. The confirmatory deed of 1903 makes it known and understood between the two parties that the islands mentioned were included in the cession of the districts and islands mentioned on 22 January 1878 agreement. Additional cession money was set at 300 dollars a year with arrears due for past occupation of 3,200 dollars. The originally agreed 5,000 dollars increased to 5,300 dollars per year payable annually.

Madrid Protocol

The Sulu sultanate later came under the control of Spain in Manila. In 1885, Great Britain, Germany and Spain signed the Madrid Protocol to cement Spanish influence over the islands of the Philippines. In the same agreement, Spain relinquished all claim to North Borneo which had belonged to the sultanate in the past to the British government.

Decline

The sultanate's political power was relinquished in March 1915 after American commanders negotiated with Sultan Jamalul Kiram on behalf of Governor-General Francis Burton Harrison. An agreement was subsequently signed, called the "Carpenter Agreement". By this agreement, the sultan relinquished all political power over territory within the Philippines (except for certain specific land granted to Sultan Jamalul Kiram and his heirs), with the religious authority as head of Islam in Sulu.

Legacy

Status within the Philippines
In 1962, the Philippine government under the administration of President Diosdado Macapagal officially recognised the continued existence of the Sultanate of Sulu. It has been asserted that Macapagal was a cousin of the Sulu sultan due to his royal descent tracing to Lakandula of Tondo, Lakandula was the uncle of the Muslim king of Manila, Rajah Sulayman, and they had a grandmother from Sulu in the person of the Tausug princess, Laila Mechanai, wife of Sultan Bolkiah of Brunei and ancestor of Rajah Matanda and Rajah Sulayman of Manila. On 24 May 1974, the reign of Sultan Mohammed Mahakuttah Kiram began and lasted until 1986. He was the last officially recognized Sulu sultan in the Philippines, having been recognized by President Ferdinand Marcos.

Pretenders
After the death of Mahakuttah A. Kiram, the Philippine national government has not formally recognised a new sultan. Mahakutta's crown prince Muedzul Lail Kiram, the heir to the throne according to the line of succession as recognised by the Philippine governments from 1915 to 1986, was 20 years old upon his father's death. Due to his young age, he failed to claim the throne in a time of political instability in the Philippines that led to the peaceful revolution and subsequent removal of President Marcos. The gap in the sultanate leadership was filled by claimants of rival branches. Therefore, the succeeding claimants to the sultanship were not crowned with the support of the Philippine government nor received formal recognition from the national government as their predecessors had until 1986. However, the Philippine national government decided to deal with one or more of the sultan claimants regarding issues concerning the sultanate’s affairs.

Muedzul Lail Tan Kiram claims that he is the legitimate successor as the 35th sultan of Sulu based on Memorandum Order 427 of 1974, in which former Philippine President Ferdinand Marcos recognised his father, Mahakuttah A. Kiram, as the sultan of Sulu.

North Borneo dispute

The dispute is based on a territorial claim by the Philippines since the era of President Diosdado Macapagal over much of the eastern part of Sabah in Malaysia. Sabah was known as North Borneo prior to the formation of the Malaysian federation in 1963. The Eastern Sabah territory was allegedly gifted by the Brunei Sultanate to the Sulu Sultanate due to Sulu intervention in the Brunei Civil War. However Brunei historian Leigh R. Wright has claimed that Sulu never really provided assistance during the civil war. The Philippines, via the heritage of the Sultanate of Sulu, claim Sabah on the basis that Sabah was only leased to the British North Borneo Company with the sultanate's sovereignty never being relinquished. The dispute stems from the difference in the interpretation used on an agreement signed between Sultanate of Sulu and the British commercial syndicate (Alfred Dent and Baron von Overbeck) in 1878, which stipulated that North Borneo was either ceded or leased (depending on translation used) to the British chartered company in return for payment of 5,000 dollars per year. Malaysia views the dispute as a "non-issue", as it not only considers the agreement in 1878 as one of cession, but it also deems that the residents had exercised their act of self-determination when they joined to form the Malaysian federation in 1963. As reported by the Secretary-General of the United Nations, the independence of North Borneo was brought about as the result of the expressed wish of the majority of the people of the territory as supported by the findings of the Cobbold Commission.

Moreover, a later 1903 Confirmation of Cession agreement between the sultan of Sulu and the British government, has provided reaffirmation regarding the understanding of the sultan of Sulu on the treaty in 1878, i.e. it is of the form of a cession. Throughout the British administration of North Borneo, the British government continued to make the annual "cession money" payment to the sultan and its heir and these payments were expressly shown in the receipts as "cession money". In a 1961 conference in London, during which a Philippine and British panel met to discuss on the Philippine claim of North Borneo, the British panel informed the Congressman Salonga that the wording of the receipts has not been challenged by the sultan or its heir. During a meeting of Maphilindo between the Philippine, Malayan and Indonesian governments in 1963, the Philippine government said the sultan of Sulu wanted the payment of 5,000 from the Malaysian government. The first Malaysian Prime Minister at the time, Tunku Abdul Rahman said he would go back to Kuala Lumpur and get on the request. Since then, the Malaysian Embassy in the Philippines issues a cheque in the amount of RM5,300 (approx. ₱77,000 or US$1,710) to the legal counsel of the heirs of the sultan of Sulu. Malaysia considers the settlement an annual "cession payment" for the disputed state, while the sultan's descendants consider it "rent". These payments however have been stopped as of 2013 in light of the attempted invasion of Sabah since Malaysia viewed that as an act of violation of the 1903 Confirmation of Cession agreement and its earlier 1878 agreement.

Republic Act 5446 in the Philippines, which took effect on 18 September 1968, regards Sabah as a territory "over which the Republic of the Philippines has acquired dominion and sovereignty". On 16 July 2011, the Supreme Court of the Philippines ruled that the Philippine claim over Sabah is retained and may be pursued in the future. , Malaysia maintains that their Sabah claim is a non-issue and non-negotiable, thereby rejecting any calls from the Philippines to resolve the matter in the International Court of Justice. Sabah authorities sees the claim made by the Philippines' Moro leader Nur Misuari to take Sabah to International Court of Justice as a non-issue and thus dismissed the claim.

In February 2022, an international court ruled that Malaysia had violated a treaty signed in 1878 of annual cession payment and would have to pay at least US$14.92 billion (RM62.59 billion) to the descendants of the Sulu sultan, which Malaysia ceased payment in 2013 as it deemed that the Sulu counterpart had first violated the treaty through 2013 Sabah incursion. The award was reportedly issued in an arbitration court in Paris, France by Spanish arbitrator Gonzalo Stampa. In March 2022, Malaysia filed an application to annul final award over claims by Sulu sultan’s heirs since the appointment of arbitrator Dr Gonzalo Stampa was itself annulled by Madrid High Court in June 2021, rendering any decisions by him to be invalid including the 2022 award. Lawyers for the heirs indicated that they will seek the award’s recognition and execution, citing a 1958 U.N. Convention on Recognition and Enforcement of Foreign Arbitral Awards. In July 2022, court bailiffs in Luxembourg served Petronas Azerbaijan (Shah Denis) and Petronas South Caucus with a "saiseie-arret," or a size order or behalf of descendants of the Sulu sultan. Petronas said it would defend its legal position.

Other
Outside the North Borneo dispute, the heirs and claimants of the Sulu sultanate have been involved in contemporary Philippine politics such as the lobbying for the creation of a constituent state called Zambasulta within the Philippines under a federal form of government.

Economy

Weapons and slave trade

Chinese who lived in Sulu ran guns across a Spanish blockade to supply the Moro datus and sultanates with weapons to fight the Spanish, who were engaging in a campaign to subjugate the Moro sultanates on Mindanao. A trade involving the Moros selling slaves and other goods in exchange for guns developed. The Chinese had entered the economy of the sultanate, taking almost total control of the sultanate's economies in Mindanao and dominating the markets. Though the sultans did not like one group of people exercising exclusive control over the economy, they did business with them.

The Chinese set up a trading network between Singapore, Zamboanga, Jolo and Sulu. The Chinese sold small arms like Enfield and Spencer Rifles to the Buayan Datu Uto. They were used to battle the Spanish invasion of Buayan. The datu paid for the weapons in slaves. The population of Chinese in Mindanao in the 1880s was 1,000. The Chinese ran guns across a Spanish blockade to sell to Mindanao Moros. The purchases of these weapons were paid for by the Moros in slaves in addition to other goods. The main group of people selling guns were the Chinese in Sulu. The Chinese took control of the economy and used steamers to ship goods for exporting and importing. Opium, ivory, textiles, and crockery were among the other goods which the Chinese sold.

The Chinese on Maimbung sent the weapons to the Sulu sultanate, who used them to battle the Spanish and resist their attacks. A Chinese-Mestizo was one of the sultan's brothers-in-law, the sultan was married to his sister. He and the sultan both owned shares in the ship (named the Far East) which helped smuggle the weapons. The Spanish launched a surprise offensive under Colonel Juan Arolas in April 1887 by attacking the sultanate's capital at Maimbung in an effort to crush resistance. Weapons were captured and the property of the Chinese were destroyed while the Chinese were deported to Jolo.

Pearling industry

After the destruction of the pirate haunts of Balanguingui effectively ending the centuries of slave raids, which the Sulu sultanate's economy had so depended on, along with the economy of mainland Mindanao, the sultanate's economy experienced a sharp decline as slaves became more inaccessible and the islands' agricultural produce wasn't enough, thus it became dependent on the Mindanao interior even for rice and produce. The Spaniards thought they had dealt the death blow for the sultanate when they captured Jolo in 1876, rather, the sultanate's capital and economic and trading hub was moved to Maimbung on the other side of the island. Up until the American occupation, this was the residence and economic centre of Sulu. This is where the Sultan Jamalul Kiram II and his adviser Hadji Butu began the Sulu pearling industry to increase the sultan's wealth, they organised the Sulu pearling fleet. The sultan's pearling fleet was active way into the early 20th century, when in 1910, the sultan reportedly sold a single giant pearl in London for $100,000.

Culture

Social class system
Among the people of the Sultanate of Sulu, the title of nobility could be acquired only by lineage, a "closed system" whereby the titled persons inherit their offices of powers and prestige.

The two main social classes of the sultanete were as follows:
 Datu (su-sultanun), which is acquired purely by lineage to the sultanate. Whereas, all male members of the royal house of Sulu should hold this hereditary title and should hold the style: His Royal Highness (HRH). Their spouse would automatically hold the title of dayang dayang (princess of the first degree). Adopted members of the royal house of Sulu hold the style of His Highness (HH) Whereas, their spouse would also hold the title of dayang dayang (princess of the first degree) and should hold the style: Her Highness according to traditional customs of Sulu.
 Datu sadja, which may be acquired through confirming the titles (gullal) on the middleman of the sultan. The gullal is made if a commoner has achieved outstanding feats or services in line of duty through display of bravery, heroism, etc. Datu sadja is life title of nobility and the title holders should hold the style: His Excellency. Whereas their spouses should hold the title of dayang and should hold the style: Her Excellency.

The commoners or maharlika are those who do not trace their descent from royalty. The Wakil Kesultan's, Panglimas, Parkasa's and Laksaman's who are commoners hold responsible positions involving administrative matters.
 Wakil Kesultanan – region representative outside the Sulu sultanate
 Panglima – region representative inside the Sulu sultanate
 Parkasa – aide-de-camp of region representative inside the Sulu sultanate
 Laksaman – sub region representative inside the Sulu sultanate

The males who hold offices above shall be addressed by the title of nobility tuan (the title is directly attached to the office), followed by the rank of the office they hold, their given name, surname and region. The females who hold offices above shall be addressed by the title of nobility Sitti (the title is directly attached to the office), followed by the rank of the office they hold, their given name, surname and region.

A very large part of the Sulu society, as well as in the Sultanate of Maguindanao were slaves captured from slave raids or bought from slave markets. They were known as the bisaya, reflecting their most common origin – the Christianized Visayans from Spanish territories in the Philippines – although they also included captured slaves from other ethnic groups throughout Southeast Asia. They were also known as banyaga, ipun, or ammas. It is estimated that as much as 50% of the population of Sulu in the 1850s were bisaya slaves and they dominated the Sulu economy. For the most part, they were treated like commoners, with their own houses and were responsible for cultivating farms and fisheries of Tausug nobility. But there were harsh punishments for attempts to escape, and a large number of the slaves were sold to European, Chinese, Makassar, and Bugis slavers in the Dutch East Indies.

Visual arts

The Sultanate of Sulu, along with the rest of Mindanao, has a long tradition of decorative arts known as okir or ukkil. Ukkil is the Tausug word for "wood carving" or "engraving". The Tausug and Maranao peoples traditionally carved and decorated their boats, houses and even grave markers with ukkil carvings. Aside from wood carvings, ukkil motifs were found on various clothing in the Sulu archipelago. Ukkil motifs tend to emphasise geometric patterns and a flowing design, with floral and leaf patterns as well as folk elements. The Tausug also decorated their weapons with these motifs, and various kris and barong blades have finely decorated handles as well as blades covered in floral patterns and the like. Bronze lantaka also bear some ukkil patterns.

Gallery
A flag coloured yellow was used in Sulu by the Chinese.

See also

 2013 Lahad Datu standoff
 List of Sunni Muslim dynasties
 Sultanate of Malacca
 Sultanate of Maguindanao
 John C. Bates
 Manila Accord
 Monarchy abolishment
 Hinduism in the Philippines
 History of the Philippines (Before 1521)
 Kiram-Bates Treaty

Notes

References

General

External links

 Line of succession of the Sultans of Sulu of the Modern Era as published in the Official Gazette of the Republic of the Philippines
 Philippine Provincial Government of Sulu – The official list of Sultans
 Sultanate of Sulu on WorldStatesMen.org

Sulu
History of Sulu
Sulu Sea
History of Sabah
Former countries
Former countries in Borneo
Former countries in Bruneian history
Former countries in Indonesian history
Former countries in Malaysian history
Former countries in Philippine history
History of the Philippines (900–1565)
Former monarchies of Asia
Moro people
Moro Rebellion
Filipino royalty
States and territories established in 1405
States and territories disestablished in 1915
1405 establishments in Asia
1915 disestablishments in Asia
15th-century establishments in Asia
1915 disestablishments in the Philippines
Maritime Southeast Asia